DWA may refer to:

Companies and organisations

 Digital Watermarking Alliance
 DreamWorks Animation
 Dutch Waterski Association
 Dallas World Aquarium
 
 DWA in Germany

Other
 A dwa is a stool of the Ashantis.
Disk wars avengers
 Doctor Who Adventures, a children's magazine based on the BBC TV series Doctor Who
 Data Warehouse Automation, acceleration and automation of data warehouse development cycles
 Dangerous Wild Animals Act 1976- UK legislation controlling ownership of dangerous animals
 Designated Waiting Area
 Domino Web Access (IBM Lotus)
 Drinking water advisories
 Dynamic window approach, a real-time collision avoidance strategy
 Humid continental climate with monsoonal influences (hot, humid, rainy summers and cold, dry winters) according to the Köppen climate classification